Rollin Summers Sturgeon (August 25, 1877 – May 10, 1961) was an American film director of silent films  active from
1910 to 1924. He directed 101 films during this period.

Filmography

Director

Uncle Tom's Cabin, Part 1 1910
A Little Lad in Dixie (1911)*short
The Trapper's Daughter (1911)*short
A Western Heroine (1911)*short
Her Cowboy Lover*short
The Half-Breed's Daughter (1911)*short
The Black Chasm (1911)*short
The Heart of a Man (1912)*short
Justice of the Desert (1912)*short
How States Are Made (1912) *short
The Price of Big Bob's Silence (1912)*short
The Craven (1912)*short
Sheriff Jim's Last Shot (1912)*short
The Greater Love (1912)*short
The Redemption of Ben Farland (1912)*short
The Triumph of Right (1912)*short
The Prayers of Manuelo (1912)*short
Her Brother (1912)*short
At the End of the Trail (1912)*short
After Many Years (1912)*short
The Redemption of Red Rube (1912)*short
Too Much Wooing of Handsome Dan (1912)*short
The Ancient Bow (1912)*short
A Wasted Sacrifice (1912)*short
The Road to Yesterday; or, Memories of Patio Days (1912)*short
The Troubled Trail (1912)*short
Bill Wilson's Gal (1912)*short
When California Was Young (1912)*short
The Spirit of the Range (1912) *short
Out of the Shadows (1912)*short
Timid May (1912)*short
Omens of the Mesa (1912)*short
Natoosa (1912)*short
The Hat (1912)
The Better Man (1912)*short
A Bit of Blue Ribbon (1913) *short
The Angel of the Desert (1913) *short
The Winning Hand (1913 *short
The Joke on Howling Wolf (1913)*short
The Smoke from Lone Bill's Cabin (1913)*short
The Whispered Word (1913) *short
Polly at the Ranch (1913)*short
A Corner in Crooks (1913) *short
When the Desert Was Kind *short
The Deceivers (1913)*short
According to Advice (1913)*short
A Matter of Matrimony (1913) *short
The Two Brothers (1913)
Bedelia Becomes a Lady (1913)*short
After the Honeymoon (1913)*short
The Power That Rules (1913)*short
Cinders (1913)*short
The Sea Maiden (1913)*short
The Wrong Pair (1913)*short
What God Hath Joined Together (1913)*short
The Spell (1913)*short
The Courage of the Commonplace (1913) *short
The Ballyhoo's Story (1913)*short
At the Sign of the Lost Angel (1913) *short
Big Bob Waits (1913) *short
Their Interest in Common (1914) *short
Silent Trails (1914) *short
Tony, the Greaser (1914) *short
The Sea Gull (1914)*short
Captain Alvarez(1914)
The Little Angel of Canyon Creek (1914)
The Sage-Brush Gal (1914)*short
The Chalice of Courage(1915)
A Child of the North (1915)*short
The Lorelei Madonna (1915)*short
The Woman's Share (1915)*short
Love and Law (1915)
Bitter Sweet (1916)*short
Bill Peter's Kid (1916)*short
God's Country and the Woman (1916)
Through the Wall (1916)
The Mystery of Lake Lethe (1917)*short
The American Consul (1917)
Whose Wife? (1917)
Edged Tools (1917)
The Upper Crust (1917)
The Rainbow Girl (1917)
The Calendar Girl (1917)
Betty and the Buccaneers (1917, see video)
A Petticoat Pilot (1918)
 The Shuttle (1918)
Unclaimed Goods (1918)
Hugon, The Mighty(1918)
Destiny (1919)
Pretty Smooth (1919)
The Sundown Trail (1919)
The Girl in the Rain (1920)
The Breath of the Gods (1920)
In Folly's Trail (1920)
The Gilded Dream (1920)
Risky Business, co-regia Harry B. Harris (1920)
Danger Ahead (1920)
The Mad Marriage (1921)
 All Dolled Up (1921)
North of the Rio Grande (1922)
West of the Water Tower (1923)
Daughters of Today (1924)

Writer
 1910 Uncle Tom's Cabin
 1912 Bill Wilson's Gal 
 1913 The Transition
 1913 The Ballyhoo's Story
 1914 Tony, the Greaser
 1914 Only a Sister

References

External links

1877 births
1961 deaths
Silent film directors
Articles containing video clips
People from Rock Island, Illinois
Male actors from Illinois
Film directors from Illinois